Nano Memory (NM) is a proprietary memory card format developed by Huawei in 2018.

NM cards are the same size as a nano SIM card, so they can be used in the same slots as nano SIMs. They are smaller than micro SD cards, freeing up space and reducing weight in smartphone designs.

NM cards utilise the eMMC 4.5 protocol and operate with read speeds of 90MB/second.

As of 2021, the cards were only supported by Huawei phones, however they are also manufactured by Lexar. Available sizes are 64GB, 128GB, and 256GB. They are more expensive than SD cards.

References

2018 in computing
Computer-related introductions in the 2010s
Huawei
Solid-state computer storage media